The 1934 Australian federal election was held in Australia on 15 September 1934. All 74 seats in the House of Representatives, and 18 of the 36 seats in the Senate were up for election. The incumbent United Australia Party led by Prime Minister of Australia Joseph Lyons formed a minority government, with 33 out of 74 seats in the House.

The opposition Australian Labor Party (ALP) led by James Scullin saw its share of the primary vote fall to an even lower number than in the 1931 election, due to the Lang Labor split. However, it was able to pick up an extra four seats on preferences and therefore improve on its position.

Almost two months after the election, the UAP entered into a coalition with the Country Party, led by Earle Page.

Future Prime Ministers Robert Menzies and John McEwen both entered parliament at this election.

Results

House of Representatives

The member for Northern Territory, Adair Blain (independent), had voting rights only for issues affecting the Territory, and so is not included in this table.

Senate

Seats changing hands

 Members listed in italics did not contest their seat at this election.

See also
 Candidates of the Australian federal election, 1934
 Members of the Australian House of Representatives, 1934–1937
 Members of the Australian Senate, 1935–1938

References
University of WA  election results in Australia since 1890
Two-party-preferred vote since 1919

Federal elections in Australia
1934 elections in Australia
September 1934 events